Regardless may refer to:

 "Regardless" (Jarryd James song), 2015
 "Regardless" (Raye and Rudimental song), 2020